Egattur is a neighbourhood in Chennai, India. It is a village in Tiruvallur district of Tamil Nadu, located on the western outskirts of Chennai. In the 2011 census it had a population of 4842 in 1251 households.

References

Villages in Tiruvallur district